is a baseball stadium in Nagano, Nagano, Japan.  It was used for the opening and closing ceremonies for the 1998 Winter Olympics.  The stadium holds 35,000 people.

The stadium is the finishing point for the annual Nagano Olympic Commemorative Marathon.

References

External links 
Minami Nagano Sports Park website

Baseball venues in Japan
Venues of the 1998 Winter Olympics
Olympic stadiums
Sports venues in Nagano Prefecture
Sports venues completed in 1998
Sport in Nagano (city)
1998 establishments in Japan